Rhipha flammans is a moth in the family Erebidae. It was described by George Hampson in 1901. It is found in Colombia, Brazil, French Guiana, Guyana, Ecuador, Peru and Bolivia.

References

Moths described in 1901
Phaegopterina